"Babaji" is a song by English rock band Supertramp, written by Roger Hodgson and also credited to other band member Rick Davies. First released on their 1977 album Even in the Quietest Moments..., it was subsequently released in Europe and in Australia as the follow up single to "Give a Little Bit".

Lyrics and music 
Hodgson wrote "Babaji" in honour of Mahavatar Babaji, whom he regarded as a Christ- or Krishna-like figure, or even a manifestation of the spirit or force of God. According to Supertramp drummer Bob Siebenberg, "Babaji is like Roger's light of life" and "Roger's guiding light sort of guy."  The lyrics reflect this in lines such as "All my life I felt that you were listening/Watching for ways to help me stay in tune" and "Babaji, oh won't you come to me/Won't you help me face the music."  Music critic Dale Winnitowy described the song's religious content as "George Harrison-like."  The lyrics emphasise the need for effort in order to attain enlightenment from the search for Babaji.

Other band members were less enthralled with the song's spiritual subject matter.  Keyboardist Rick Davies told NME that "Personally, I decry it. I'd sooner remain anonymous than become religious. I might fight with Roger on this next album about that ... It's not right. You've got people in the band who couldn't give a damn."  Saxophonist John Helliwell stated that "when [Hodgson] wrote about Christ or Babaji—whoever that is—we just wished he would sing about something else."

According to Siebenberg, Hodgson "came up with the different bits of time" that he played on the song.  He said that of the songs on Even in the Quietest Moments... "Babaji" took the longest to work out the drum parts because everything had to be very precise, including which parts were played on which drum or bell.

The Rough Guide to Rock critic Lance Phillips described the song as a progressive rock song and described the theme as "lost-little-boy spiritualism."

Reception 
Record World said that "strings and electronic undercurrents create an exceptionally colorful tapestry which is topped off by an exemplary vocal blend." Music critic Mark Moran described "Babaji",  as well as "Give a Little Bit", as having a "leisurely pace and gentle melody" which Helliwell attributed to the band's growing maturity.  Steve Wosahla of the Messenger-Press similarly acknowledged those two songs as representing the "more 'subtle' approach the band had hoped to incorporate" into Even in the Quietest Moments..., calling them "excellent complements" to the harder songs on the album.  Brandon Sun critic Graham Hicks felt that the song "could have been a classic" but falls short due to the non-electric piano being unable to achieve the "light, strident" notes Hicks believes the song calls for, and due to "unimaginative and repetitive" percussion and bass guitar playing.  Sounds critic Geoff Barton found "Babaji" to be "less than enthralling."  AllMusic critic Stephen Thomas Erlewine described it as "a pseudo-spiritual moment that falls from the pop mark."

"Babaji" was later released on the 1992 compilation album The Very Best of Supertramp 2.

Personnel 

 Roger Hodgson – vocals and piano
 Rick Davies – keyboards and vocals
 John Helliwell – Saxophone, clarinet and vocals
 Dougie Thomson – bass guitar
 Bob Siebenberg – drums and percussion

References 

1977 singles
Songs written by Roger Hodgson
Supertramp songs
Songs written by Rick Davies
A&M Records singles